The list of shipwrecks in January 1861 includes ships sunk, foundered, wrecked, grounded, or otherwise lost during January 1861.

1 January

2 January

3 January

4 January

5 January

6 January

7 January

8 January

9 January

10 January

11 January

12 January

13 January

14 January

15 January

16 January

17 January

18 January

19 January

20 January

21 January

22 January

23 January

24 January

25 January

26 January

27 January

28 January

29 January

30 January

31 January

Unknown date

References

Notes

Bibliography
 Gaines, W. Craig, Encyclopedia of Civil War Shipwrecks, Louisiana State University Press, 2008 , .
 Ingram, C. W. N., and Wheatley, P. O., (1936) Shipwrecks: New Zealand disasters 1795–1936. Dunedin, NZ: Dunedin Book Publishing Association.

1861-01
Maritime incidents in January 1861